Waterhouses is a civil parish in the district of Staffordshire Moorlands, Staffordshire, England. It contains 46 listed buildings that are recorded in the National Heritage List for England.  Of these, three are at Grade II*, the middle of the three grades, and the others are at Grade II, the lowest grade.  The parish consists of the village of Waterhouses and the surrounding area, including the settlements of Calton, Cauldon, and Waterfall.  The area is rural and most of the listed buildings are houses and associated structures, cottages, farmhouses and farm buildings.  The other listed buildings include the ruins of a former large house, churches and items in churchyards, stocks and a pump on a village green, public houses, and a series of mileposts along the A523 road. 


Key

Buildings

References

Citations

Sources

Lists of listed buildings in Staffordshire